Catherine Caylee Cowan is an American actress and filmmaker. She is best known for her roles in Sunrise in Heaven (2019), Willy's Wonderland (2021), Spinning Gold (2022), and Frank and Penelope (2022).

Early life 
Cowan was born in Los Angeles, California. She is of Jewish descent. She was raised by a single mother and is the youngest of three children. After graduating from high school, Cowan began acting in theater productions. She appeared in productions of Three Sisters by Anton Chekhov, The Glass Menagerie by Tennessee Williams, and Danny in the Deep Blue Sea by John Patrick Shanley.

Career 
Cowan made her film debut playing the character of Jan in the American romance period drama Sunrise in Heaven, an adaptation of Jan Gilbert Hurst's book His Sunrise My Sunset. The movie was released on Netflix on April 1st, 2020. In 2021, she played the supporting role of Kathy Barnes in the action comedy horror Willy's Wonderland  acting alongside Nicolas Cage in an ensemble of teen actors.

In 2022, Cowan was cast in a lead role in the independent romantic thriller Frank and Penelope, as Penelope, "a doe-eyed femme fatale". She attended the world premiere of the movie at the Riviera International Film Festival, and the screening at the Cannes Film Festival. 

In 2023, Cowan appeared in a supporting role as Farrah Lee in the biographical musical drama, Spinning Gold, and in a supporting role as Felicity in the science fiction thriller, Divinity, directed by Eddie Alcazar and produced by Steven Soderbergh which premiered and was in competition at Sundance Film Festival. She is a co-executive producer on Robert Rodriguez's action-thriller, Hypnotic, which screened at the South by Southwest film festival.

Cowan has been cast as Christian Christmas in the upcoming movie Holiday Twist, directed by Stephanie Garvin, which is expected to be released in November 2022.

Filmography

Film

Television

Music video

Personal life 
Cowan has been in a relationship with Academy Award-winner actor Casey Affleck since January 2021.

References

External links 
 

Living people
Year of birth missing (living people)
21st-century American actresses
Actresses from Los Angeles
People from Tarzana, Los Angeles